Drosera burmanni, the tropical sundew, is a small, compact species in the carnivorous plant genus Drosera. Its natural geographical range includes the tropical and subtropical regions of Asia, Australia, India, Japan, southeast Asia, Oceania, Africa and China's Guangxi, Guangdong, Yunnan, Fujian, Taiwan. It normally spans only  in diameter. It is one of the fastest trapping sundews as well, and its leaves can curl around an insect in only a few seconds, compared to the minutes or hours it takes other sundews to surround their prey. In nature, D. burmanni is an annual, but in cultivation, when grown indoors during the cold months, it can live for many years. Since D. burmanni is an annual, it produces large amounts of seed. Drosera burmanni has been considered a powerful rubefacient in Ayurveda.

Drosera burmanni is an herb that produces very short stems and leaves in a rosette. Each wedge-shaped leaf is typically 8–10 mm long and 5–6 mm wide.

The first brief description of the species was written by Paul Hermann and published after Hermann's death by William Sherard in Musaeum Zeylanicum. It was described in more detail by Johannes Burman in his 1737 publication on the flora of Ceylon. Burman used the polynomial Ros solis foliis circa radicem in orbem dispositis, but the species was not formally published until 1794 when Martin Vahl named it in honor of Burman as Drosera burmanni (the species epithet is usually orthographically corrected to burmannii). In 1871 Heinrich Gustav Reichenbach described a new species, D. dietrichiana, named after its discoverer Amalie Dietrich. In his 1906 monograph of the Droseraceae, Ludwig Diels reduced this species to a variety of D. burmanni. This variety was described as being a larger and more robust plant than D. burmanni var. burmanni. Both D. dietrichiana and the variety are now considered synonyms of D. burmanni.

See also
List of Drosera species

Gallery

References

External links

Carnivorous plants of Asia
Carnivorous plants of Australia
Caryophyllales of Australia
burmannii
Eudicots of Western Australia
Flora of Bangladesh
Flora of Thailand
Flora of Vietnam
Flora of Malesia
Flora of New Guinea
Flora of the Northern Territory
Flora of Queensland
Flora of New South Wales
Plants described in 1794
Taxa named by Martin Vahl